Sofía Acedo Reyes (born September 24, 1985 in Melilla, Spain) is a Spanish politician and senator. She is the current senator representing Melilla in the senate of Spain. She was first elected since December 20, 2015 in the 11th Cortes Generales and the 12th Cortes Generales.

Biography 
Acedo Reyes was born on September 24, 1985 in Melilla, Spain. She later relocated to Granada for her university education where she studied and graduated in Sociology. During the 2008 elections, she was on the list of candidates to the Senate under the People's Party (PP). In 2011, she was introduced as number 3 of the People's Party in the regional elections, being elected as a deputy in the Assembly of Melilla. On December 20, 2015, Reyes was elected senator representing Melilla.

After her first term, on November 10, 2019, she was re-elected senator for Melilla, winning with over 8,912 votes compared to the 8,860 votes obtained by Dunia Al-Mansouri Umpierrez of the Coalition for Melilla.

References 

Living people
1985 births
People from Melilla
Spanish politicians
21st-century Spanish politicians